Pictish is the extinct Brittonic language spoken by the Picts, the people of eastern and northern Scotland from Late Antiquity to the Early Middle Ages. Virtually no direct attestations of Pictish remain, short of a limited number of geographical and personal names found on monuments and the contemporary records in the area controlled by the kingdoms of the Picts, dating to the early medieval period. Such evidence, however, points strongly to the language being an Insular Celtic language related to the Brittonic language spoken prior to Anglo-Saxon settlement in what is now southern Scotland, England, and Wales.

The prevailing view in the second half of the 20th century was that Pictish was a non-Indo-European language isolate, predating a Gaelic colonisation of Scotland or that a non-Indo-European Pictish and Brittonic Pictish language coexisted.

Pictish was replaced by – or subsumed into – Gaelic in the latter centuries of the Pictish period. During the reign of Domnall mac Causantín (889–900), outsiders began to refer to the region as the kingdom of Alba rather than the kingdom of the Picts. However, the Pictish language did not disappear suddenly. A process of Gaelicisation (which may have begun generations earlier) was clearly underway during the reigns of Domnall and his successors. By a certain point, probably during the 11th century, all the inhabitants of Alba had become fully Gaelicised Scots, and the Pictish identity was forgotten.

Language classification

The existence of a distinct Pictish language during the Early Middle Ages is attested clearly in Bede's early eighth-century Historia ecclesiastica gentis Anglorum, which names Pictish as a language distinct from that spoken by the Britons, the Irish, and the English. Bede states that Columba, a Gael, used an interpreter during his mission to the Picts. A number of competing theories have been advanced regarding the nature of the Pictish language: 
 Pictish was an insular Celtic language allied to the P-Celtic language Brittonic (descendants Welsh, Cornish, Cumbric, and Breton). 
 Pictish was an insular Celtic language allied to the Q-Celtic (Goidelic) languages (Irish, Scottish Gaelic, and Manx). 
 Pictish was a pre-Indo-European language, a relic of the Bronze Age.

Most modern scholars agree that Pictish was, at the time of the Roman conquest, a branch of the Brittonic language, while a few scholars accept that it was merely 'related' to the Brittonic language. Pictish came under increasing influence from the Goidelic language spoken in Dál Riata from the eighth century until its eventual replacement.

Pictish is thought to have influenced the development of modern Scottish Gaelic. This is perhaps most obvious in the contribution of loan words, but, more importantly, Pictish is thought to have influenced the syntax of Scottish Gaelic, which is more similar to Brittonic languages than to Irish.

Position within Celtic
The evidence of place names and personal names demonstrates that an insular Celtic language related to the more southerly Brittonic languages was formerly spoken in the Pictish area. The view of Pictish as a P-Celtic language was first proposed in 1582 by George Buchanan, who aligned the language with Gaulish. A compatible view was advanced by antiquarian George Chalmers in the early 19th century. Chalmers considered that Pictish and Brittonic were one and the same, basing his argument on P-Celtic orthography in the Pictish king lists and in place names predominant in historically Pictish areas.

Although demonstrably Celtic-speaking, the exact linguistic affinity of the Roman-era predecessors to the Picts is difficult to securely establish. The personal name Vepogeni, recorded c. 230 AD, implies that P-Celtic was spoken by at least the Caledonians.

Celtic scholar Whitley Stokes, in a philological study of the Irish annals, concluded that Pictish was closely related to Welsh. This conclusion was supported by philologist Alexander MacBain's analysis of the place and tribe names in Ptolemy's second-century Geographia. Toponymist William Watson's exhaustive review of Scottish place names demonstrated convincingly the existence of a dominant P-Celtic language in historically Pictish areas, concluding that the Pictish language was a northern extension of British and that Gaelic was a later introduction from Ireland.

William Forbes Skene argued in 1837 that Pictish was a Goidelic language, the ancestor of modern Scottish Gaelic. He suggested that Columba's use of an interpreter reflected his preaching to the Picts in Latin, rather than any difference between the Irish and Pictish languages. This view, involving independent settlement of Ireland and Scotland by Goidelic people, obviated an Irish influence in the development of Gaelic Scotland and enjoyed wide popular acceptance in 19th-century Scotland.

Skene later revised his view of Pictish, noting that it appeared to share elements of both Goidelic and Brittonic:

The Picts were under increasing political, social, and linguistic influence from Dál Riata from around the eighth century. The Picts were steadily Gaelicised through the latter centuries of the Pictish kingdom, and by the time of the merging of the Pictish and Dál Riatan kingdoms, the Picts were essentially a Gaelic-speaking people. Forsyth speculates that a period of bilingualism may have outlasted the Pictish kingdom in peripheral areas by several generations. Scottish Gaelic, unlike Irish, maintains a substantial corpus of Brittonic loan-words and, moreover, uses a verbal system modelled on the same pattern as Welsh.

The traditional Q-Celtic vs P-Celtic model, involving separate migrations of P-Celtic and Q-Celtic speaking settlers into the British Isles, is one of mutual unintelligibility, with the Irish Sea serving as the frontier between the two. However, it is likely that the Insular Celtic languages evolved from a more-or-less unified proto-Celtic language within the British Isles. Divergence between P-Celtic Pictish and Q-Celtic Dalriadan Goidelic was slight enough to allow Picts and Dalriadans to understand each other's language to some degree. Under this scenario, a gradual linguistic convergence is conceivable and even probable given the presence of the Columban Church in Pictland.

Pre-Indo-European theory

In 1892, John Rhys proposed that Pictish was a non-Indo-European language. This opinion was based on the apparently unintelligible ogham inscriptions found in historically Pictish areas (compare ). A similar position was taken by Heinrich Zimmer, who argued that the Picts' supposedly exotic cultural practices (tattooing and matriliny) were equally non-Indo-European, and a pre-Indo-European model was maintained by some well into the 20th century.

A modified version of this theory was advanced in an influential 1955 review of Pictish by Kenneth Jackson, who proposed a two-language model: while Pictish was undoubtedly P-Celtic, it may have had a non-Celtic substratum and a second language may have been used for inscriptions. Jackson's hypothesis was framed in the then-current model that a Brittonic elite, identified as the Broch-builders, had migrated from the south of Britain into Pictish territory, dominating a pre-Celtic majority. He used this to reconcile the perceived translational difficulties of Ogham with the overwhelming evidence for a P-Celtic Pictish language. Jackson was content to write off Ogham inscriptions as inherently unintelligible.

Jackson's model became the orthodox position for the latter half of the 20th century. However, it became progressively undermined by advances in understanding of late Iron Age archaeology. Celtic interpretations have been suggested for a number of Ogham inscriptions in recent years, though this remains a matter of debate.

Discredited theories
Traditional accounts (now rejected) claimed that the Picts had migrated to Scotland from Scythia, a region that encompassed Eastern Europe and Central Asia. Buchanan, looking for a Scythian P-Celtic candidate for the ancestral Pict, settled on the Gaulish-speaking Cotini (which he rendered as Gothuni), a tribe from the region that is now Slovakia. This was later misunderstood by Robert Sibbald in 1710, who equated Gothuni with the Germanic-speaking Goths. John Pinkerton expanded on this in 1789, claiming that Pictish was the predecessor to modern Scots. Pinkerton's arguments were often rambling, bizarre and clearly motivated by his belief that Celts were an inferior people. The theory of a Germanic Pictish language is no longer considered credible.

Linguistic evidence 
Linguist Guto Rhys summarized evidence for the Pictish language as amounting to "a few hundred" individual articles of information. Evidence is most numerous in the form of proper nouns, such as place-names in Pictish regions, and personal names borne by Picts according to Scottish, Irish and Anglo-Saxon sources. Other sources include Ogham inscriptions and Pictish words surviving as loans; especially in the Scottish Gaelic language.

Place names 
Pictish toponyms occur in Scotland north of the River Forth. Distributed from Fife to the Isle of Skye, they are relatively abundant south of the Dornoch Firth but rare in the extreme north.

Many principal settlements and geographical features of the region bear names of Pictish origin, including:
Aberdeen, Aberdeenshire. Meaning "mouth of the River Don" (cf. Welsh , "estuary, confluence").
Cupar, Fife. Meaning "confluence" (cf. Welsh ).
Keith, Banffshire. Meaning "forest" (cf. Welsh ).
Kirkcaldy, Fife. Meaning "place of the hard fort" from caer, "fort" and caled, "hard".
Perth, Perthshire. Meaning "wood, grove" (cf. Welsh ).
Yell, Shetland. Meaning "unfruitful land" (cf. Welsh iâl).

Several Pictish elements occur multiple times in the region. This table lists selected instances according to the Welsh equivalent.

Some Pictish names have been succeeded by Gaelic forms, and in certain instances the earlier forms appear on historical record.
Inverbervie, Kincardineshire. Haberberui in 1290, demonstrates that a Pictish aber, "estuary, confluence" has been supplanted by Gaelic inbhir, with identical meaning.
Inverie, Fife. A possible early form, Auerin (1141), may be for *Aberin, thus attesting the same inbhir for aber substitution as above.
Kindrochit Alian, Aberdeenshire. Doldauha before c. 850 AD, in which the first element is dôl ("meadow").
Strathtyrum, Fife. Trestirum in 1190, suggestive of assimilation of a Pictish tref, "estate", to (unconnected) Gaelic srath, "a valley".

Ogham inscriptions 
Although the interpretation of over 40 Ogham inscriptions remains uncertain, several have been acknowledged to contain Brittonic forms. Guto Rhys (2015) notes that significant caution is required in the interpretation of such inscriptions because crucial information, such as the orthographic key, the linguistic context in which they were composed and the extent of literacy in Pictland, remains unknown.

(The only direct continuation in Middle Welsh is 1sg.  < *u̯rakt-ū in the poem known as "Peis Dinogat" in the Book of Aneirin; this form was eventually reformed to gwnaeth.) With the fourth word explained as spirantized Pictish  'cross' (Welsh  < Latin ) and the corrupted first word a personal name, the inscription may represent a Pictish sentence explaining who carved the cross.

The Shetland inscriptions at Cunningsburgh and Lunnasting reading  and  have been understood as Brittonic expressions meaning "this is as great" and "this is as far", respectively, messages appropriate for boundary stones.

Influence on Gaelic 
Etymological investigation of the Scottish Gaelic language, in particular the 1896 efforts of Alexander Macbain, has demonstrated the presence of a corpus of Pictish loanwords in the language.

The following are possibilities:
bad. Meaning "cluster" (cf. Breton )
bagaid. Meaning "cluster, troop" (cf. Welsh )
dail. Meaning "meadow" (cf. Welsh )
dìleab. Meaning "legacy"
monadh. Meaning "mountain, moor" (cf. Welsh )
mormaer. Legal term meaning "earl, count" (cf. Welsh  + )
pailt. Meaning "plentiful" (cf. Cornish , Middle Welsh )
peasg. Meaning "gash, chilblain" (cf. Welsh )
peit. Meaning "small area of ground" (cf. Welsh )
pòr. Meaning "grain, crops" (cf. Welsh )
preas. Meaning "bush, thicket" (cf. Welsh )

On the basis of a number of the loans attesting shorter vowels than other British cognates, linguist Guto Rhys proposed Pictish resisted some 6th century Latin-influenced sound changes. Rhys has also noted the potentially "fiscal" profile of several of the loans, and hypothesized that they could have entered Gaelic as a package in a governmental context.

Several Gaelic nouns have meanings more closely matching their Brittonic cognates than those in Irish, indicating that Pictish may have influenced the sense and usage of these words as a substrate. Srath (> Strath-) is recorded to have meant "grassland" in Old Irish, whereas the modern Gaelic realization means "broad valley", exactly as in its Brittonic cognates (cf. Welsh ). Dùn, foithir, lios, ràth and tom may, by the same token, attest a substrate influence from Pictish.

Greene noted that the verbal system inherited in Gaelic from Old Irish had been brought "into complete conformity with that of modern spoken Welsh", and consequently Guto Rhys adjudged that Pictish may have modified Gaelic verbal syntax.

Personal names 
Pictish personal names, as acquired from documents such as the Poppleton manuscript, show significant diagnostically Brittonic features including the retention of final -st and initial w- (cf. P. Uurgust vs. Goidelic Fergus) as well as development of -ora- to -ara- (cf. P. Taran vs G. torann).

Several Pictish names are directly paralleled by names and nouns in other Brittonic languages. Several Pictish names are listed below according to their equivalents in Brittonic and other Celtic languages.

Several elements common in forming Brittonic names also appear in the names of Picts. These include *jʉð, "lord" (> Ciniod) and *res, "ardor" (> Resad; cf. Welsh Rhys).

Notes

References

 

 

 
Extinct Celtic languages
Language
Extinct languages of Scotland
Extinct languages of Europe
Languages extinct in the 11th century
Brittonic languages
Unclassified languages of Europe
Unclassified Indo-European languages